Danielle Aitchison (born 16 August 2001) is a New Zealand para-athlete who is representing her country at the 2020 Summer Paralympics. She competes in the 100 metres and 200 metres in international events.

Biography 
Aitchison was born in Morrinsville in 2001 and grew up in Patetonga in the Hauraki District. She attended Kaihere School. 

Aitchison was born with severe jaundice, cerebral palsy and 80-90% hearing loss. She has two uncommon types of cerebral palsy: athetoid and ataxia. She has cochlear implants in both ears.

While growing up Aitchison participated in ballet, netball and hockey. She began competing in para-athletics at age 16 in 2017, at the Halberg Junior Disability Games in Auckland, New Zealand. She has competed in long jump and won a national title in the event.

In 2019 she represented New Zealand internationally for the first time at the 2019 World Para Athletics Championships in Dubai, United Arab Emirates. She finished fourth in the 100m event and won silver in the 200m event with an Oceania record time (29.86sec).

Competing at the 2020 Summer Paralympics in the women's 200 metres T36, Aitchison finished fastest in her heat. In the final, Aitchison won silver with a time of 29.88. She also won bronze in the women's 100 metres T36.

References

External links
 
 

2001 births
Living people
People from Morrinsville
New Zealand female sprinters
Paralympic athletes of New Zealand
Paralympic medalists in athletics (track and field)
Paralympic silver medalists for New Zealand
Paralympic bronze medalists for New Zealand
Athletes (track and field) at the 2020 Summer Paralympics
Medalists at the 2020 Summer Paralympics
Sportspeople from Waikato
21st-century New Zealand women